Frode Berg (born 24 October 1971) is a Norwegian bassist, known from the scenes of classical and contemporary music, jazz, pop and rock. As jazz musician known primarily from his performances within Helge Lien Trio with Knut Aalefjær as the third party. On the scenes of classical and contemporary music primarily known as an orchestral bassist in the Oslo Philharmonic Orchestra (from 2010) and the Tampere Philharmonic Orchestra (2011). In addition he is known from playing with such as John Parricelli, Peter Erskine and Martin Robertson.

Career 

Berg was born in Oslo. He grew up as the son of a seamen priest, in Australia, Belgium, France and England, before returning to Norway at 11 years old. In adolescence (1984–90) he was living in Lier and received lessons in piano and trumpet. He joined a Rock band when at school and in his college years he played in the bands Ti'nok, Trio April and Jazz House, or with established musicians such as Einar Iversen, Harald Gundhus, Odd Riisnæs, Christian Reim, and others. He also participated in the local band ... and we hate Johnny playing at Kongsberg Jazz Festival 1990. He started at the Norwegian Academy of Music in Oslo the same year. Eventually Berg had something of a revelation when he listened to the music of Mahavishnu Orchestra with Jonas Hellborg on bass and Danny Gottlieb on drums. Later he played a lot with the latter, along with guitarist Knut Værnes.

Berg studied classical bass at the Norwegian Academy of Music in Oslo (1990–94) under the guidance of Professor Knut Guettler, and has since been a sought bassist in both classical and jazz contexts. He has had a powerful influence on the Norwegian Music Scene since 1992. His first international job was with disco queen Donna Summer (1993), and in 2003 he released his first album under his own name, Dig It!. On this recording he has chosen musicians from the top shelf of Norwegian Jazz musicians like Petter Wettre on the saxophone has many solo releases and tours in Norway and internationally has made himself well known. Roy Powell on piano originally from England, has for years played with Sigurd Køhn, and on his last solo album, he brought along the likes of Arild Andersen (bass). Powell recently released a critically acclaimed album Solace on Nagel Heyer-label. Andreas Bye, through his work with Noora, Jon Eberson and national bands around the Norwegian Academy of Music in Oslo made his mark in the burgeoning young musician in Oslo. Bye is now Bugge Wesseltoft's permanent drummer on his touring around the world.

Berg has received great attention for his performances within Helge Lien Trio (seven albums), and is well known in Norway for his cooperation with international greats like Sir Paul McCartney, Bobby Shew, Andy Sheppard, Frank Gambale and Dee Dee Bridgewater, performing with Luciano Pavarotti, and has otherwise participated in about 50 different albums, including Anno 96 with Oslo Groove Company, 8:97 with Knut Værnes, Spiral Circle (DIW, 2002) nominated for the Spellemannprisen in 2002, Hello Troll (2008) receiving the Spellemannprisen in 2008, and Finger Magic with Erik Smith Trio.

Honors 
Spellemannprisen 2008 in the class Jazz, for Hello Troll within Helge Lien Trio

Discography

Solo albums 
2003: Dig It! (Nagel-Heyer)

Collaborations 
With Knut Værnes and Kim Ofstad
1995: Jacques Tati (Curling Legs)

With Oslo Groove Company
1996: Anno 1996 (Groove Records)

With Jens Wendelboe's Crazy Energy Jazz Quartet
1997: Get Crazy! (Crazy Music)
1997: Crazy Energy Jazz Quartet (Crazy Music)

With Knut Værnes & Danny Gottlieb
1997: 8:97 (Curling Legs)
1999: Super Duper (Curling Legs)

With Gisle Torvik
1999: Naken Uten Gitar, including with Sigmund Groven, Petter Wettre, Endre Christiansen and Torstein Lofthus

With Erik Smith Trio
2005: Finger Magic (Gats Production)

With Helge Lien Trio
2001: What are you doing the rest of your life? (Curling Legs)
2002: Spiral Circle (DIW)
2003: Asymmetrics (DIW)
2005: Helge Lien Trio – Live (Curling Legs)
2006: To the little radio(DIW)
2008: Hello Troll (Ozella)
2011: Natsukashii (Ozella)
2015: Bridges (ACT), feat. Adam Baldych

With Frank Brodahl's Trumpet Jungle
2003: Frank Brodahl's Trumpet Jungle (Trumpet Junge Records)

With Eidsvoll Storband
2003: Eidsvoll Storband (Trumpet Junge), with Sondre Brattland

With Even Skatrud Andersen
2005: Eveneven (Schmell)

The trio with Camilla Susann Haug
2005: Noen Ganger Blått (Kirkelig kulturverksted)

The trio with Silje Nergaard
2009: A Thousand True Stories (Sony)

With Petter Wettre
2014: Playing up to My Standards (Household Records), including with Bjørn Vidar Solli, Erlend Slettevoll and Adam Pache

References

External links 
Frode Berg: Dig It! on JazzTimes
Bass Solo - Frode Berg - Junglesoup Factory on YouTube

Norwegian jazz upright-bassists
Male double-bassists
Jazz double-bassists
Norwegian jazz composers
Household Records artists
Spellemannprisen winners
Musicians from Oslo
Living people
1971 births
21st-century double-bassists
21st-century Norwegian male musicians
Oslo Groove Company members
Helge Lien Trio members